, abbreviated as Shikashū, is an imperial anthology of Japanese waka, compiled c.1151–1154 CE at the behest of the Emperor Sutoku who ordered it in 1144. It was compiled by Fujiwara no Akisuke (1090–1155; a member of the Rokujō). It consists of ten volumes containing 411 poems.

The Shikashū is the shortest of the imperial anthologies. Despite Akisuke's ostensibly conservative nature, it is rather eclectic and has a wide variety of poems, including one by Saigyo.

See also
Sankashū
Shin Kokin Wakashū

References

Further reading
pg. 483 of Japanese Court Poetry, Earl Miner, Robert H. Brower. 1961, Stanford University Press, LCCN 61-10925

Shikashū
Late Old Japanese texts
Heian period in literature
1150s in Japan
12th-century poetry